Uz was an unincorporated community in  Letcher County, Kentucky, United States.  Despite the appearance that it would rhyme with "buzz", the area was a mining camp for the U Z Mines, and is pronounced "you-zee". Uz has been noted for its short name.
A competing explanation for the place name is given from railroad origins.  W. S. Morton of Louisville & Nashville Railroad stated that it took the patience of Job to deal with local property owners and should be named after the biblical home of Job “Uz wuz.”

References

Unincorporated communities in Letcher County, Kentucky
Unincorporated communities in Kentucky